Sleepline is the fifteenth studio album by electronic and vaporwave artist Vektroid under the alias New Dreams Ltd., released on February 14, 2016.

Release
The album was released simultaneously with Fuji Grid TV EX and Shader Complete, reissues of her extended play Prism Genesis and her album Shader.

Context
The album is part of the vaporwave genre and features samples of Japanese television commercials from the 1980s, particularly those advertising airlines and holiday destinations. The album can be streamed on her Bandcamp. In 2018, Sleepline was re-released on CD and vinyl.

Track listing

References

See also
New age music

Vektroid albums
2016 albums
Vaporwave albums